Lamprosema sinaloanensis is a moth in the family Crambidae. It was described by Harrison Gray Dyar Jr. in 1923. It is found in Mexico (Sinaloa) and the United States (southern California and southern Texas).

References

Moths described in 1923
Lamprosema
Moths of North America